UK/European Tour EP is an EP by the Scottish group Mogwai, released in 2001.

Overview
UK/European Tour EP was sold as merchandise on Mogwai's tour of the UK and Europe in November–December 2001. It compiles tracks from various sources released in 2001. "Close Encounters" is a bonus track on the Japanese version of the album, Rock Action. "Drum Machine" and "D to E" are from the US Tour EP, and the live versions of "You Don't Know Jesus" and "Helicon 1" are bonus tracks on the Japanese, Australian, and New Zealand versions of the "My Father My King" single.

Track listing 
All songs were written by Mogwai.
"Close Encounters" – 3:55
"Drum Machine" – 3:30
"D to E" – 6:04
"You Don't Know Jesus (Live)" – 6:14
"Helicon 1 (Live)" – 7:53

Personnel 
 Stuart Braithwaite – guitar, keyboard
 Dominic Aitchison – bass guitar
 John Cummings – guitar
 Barry Burns – guitar, piano
 Martin Bulloch – drums

Release history 
UK/European Tour EP was released in 2001.

Mogwai EPs
2001 EPs